Tbilisi Fashion Week, or TFW is a Georgian fashion week in its capital city of Tbilisi. TFW hosts industry professionals twice a year, in Spring and Fall. TFW was established in 2009 during Tbilisoba festival.

TFW is a fashion hub in the Caucasus which maintains the fashion industry development and introduces new faces and exports Georgian fashion production.

Georgia's fashion industry, TFW and Mercedes-Benz Fashion Week Tbilisi have garnered international attention following the success of home-grown talent designers like David Koma, and more importantly Demna Gvasalia of luxury brand Balenciaga and his own brand Vetements. Tbilisi is now dubbed as one of the "fashion capitals of Eastern Europe".

Locations
TFW keeps experimenting hosting the fashion venues on different locations all over the city, from museums or art galleries, nightclubs like Bassiani to Old Tbilisi streets.

See also
Georgian culture
Vetements

References

External links

 

Fashion of Georgia (country)
Fashion events in Georgia (country)
Culture in Tbilisi
2009 establishments in Georgia (country)
Recurring events established in 2009
Fashion weeks